A Christian Ministry in the National Parks (ACMNP) is the largest and the oldest ecumenical Christian ministry in the United States National Parks, serving since the 1950s.

History

1949-1951
In the first half of the 20th century, national parks in the United States were seeing increasingly high numbers of visitors. The influx of people visiting the national parks instigated a proposal from the National Council of Churches for a cooperative national ministry, which would respond to the faith-based needs of park visitors, local residents, and employees. 

While working as a bellhop at the Old Faithful Inn during the summer of 1949, Princeton Seminary student Warren W. Ost was asked by the Superintendent's Church Committee of Yellowstone to contribute his insight on how a student ministry could be further developed in Yellowstone National Park. As a result, Ost returned to Yellowstone in 1950 with fellow seminarian Donald Bower to lead interdenominational Sunday worship services in several areas of the park, thus expanding the idea of student-led national park ministry and laying the foundation for what would soon become "A Protestant Ministry in the National Parks".

The Superintendent's Church Committee in Yellowstone was encouraged by Ost's and Bower's 1950 efforts and recommended the ministry continue the following summer. Having become familiar with the ministry initiative in Yellowstone, John MacKay, then president of Princeton Seminary, agreed and helped create opportunities for other Princeton Seminary students to participate. During the summer of 1951, four student ministers and several college students traveled to Yellowstone to lead interdenominational worship services. Hamilton Stores and the Yellowstone Park Company employed the students, inaugurating an important relationship between the ministry and park concession companies that still exists today.

Based upon the results from 1951, the Superintendent's Church Committee recommended that Fred Johnston, acting Superintendent of Yellowstone, propose to the director of the National Park Service, Conrad Wirth, that the fledgling student ministry in Yellowstone be extended to other national parks.  Warren Ost met with representatives from the National Park Service and the National Council of Churches to discuss an interdenominational national park chaplaincy program. The National Park Service responded with general approval and emphasized that its relationship with this new ministry be one of "cooperation and not of sponsorship or funding."

Nationwide expansion
As an interdenominational ministry group with national influence, The National Council of Churches (NCC) was a natural fit to guide the ministry in Yellowstone into the future.  Along with Warren Ost, who was becoming the mouthpiece for the ministry, representatives from the Department of Evangelism of the NCC conferred with officials from the National Park Service in April 1952, with a proposed outline of a national ministry that included Sunday worship services, daily Vacation Bible School opportunities, music programs, and special programs for children and youth.

Three weeks later the Dept. of Evangelism of the NCC received approval from the director of the National Park Service, Conrad Wirth, to move forward with the proposed "Protestant Ministry in the National Parks."  Soon thereafter, the Dept. of Evangelism voted to assume administrative responsibilities, invite newly ordained Rev. Warren Ost to be the ministry's first director, and to adopt the new name "A Christian Ministry in the National Parks."  Subsequently, seventeen students were assigned to ministry sites in Yellowstone, Grand Canyon, Sequoia, Yosemite National Parks.

1993 Lawsuit 
In 1993, Karl and Rita Girshman, a Jewish couple, were visiting Big Bend National Park and were disturbed by one of the students serving with ACMNP.  The couple sued and forced several changes in the way ACMNP, the NPS, and park concessioners operated. 

Before the suit, ACMNP used the distinctive arrowhead used by the NPS on most of its correspondence.  As a result of the suit, the NPS was forced to crack down on who and under what circumstances the arrowhead could be used.  

Concessioners were barred from using religious affiliation in their hiring practices.  Before the court case, ACMNP was able to guarantee employment with many of the park concessioners as it had arrangements to place students at various locations.  As part of the settlement, the NPS sent a letter stating, that it would be against the law to "reserve or set aside jobs for individuals affiliated with one religious group or another...  Employment discrimination by our concessioners will not be tolerated."  

Many parks made exceptions to ACMNP obtaining permits; after the case, ACMNP activities required obtaining permits just as any other group would.

Current activity 
ACMNP places ministry staff members in 45-50 national parks each summer, the majority of whom are college and seminary students.  The Grand Canyon, Death Valley, Big Bend, Grand Teton, Rocky Mountain, Everglades, and the U.S. Virgin Islands National Parks host small placements of ministry staff during the winter months. ACMNP is also affiliated with Grand Canyon Community Church in Arizona and two churches near Yellowstone: Mount Republic Chapel of Peace and Gardiner Community Church in Gardiner, Montana.

Infrastructure & Leadership

Infrastructure
The transition away from the NCC in 1972 most directly impacted financial management and program development, and thus prompted the creation of the ministry's National Advisory Board and the formation of the Board of Trustees to manage the newly founded non-profit corporation. The size of the National Advisory Board has fluctuated over the years but hovers at around 40 persons.

The administrative positions in the national office were originally formatted so that college-aged interns assisted with recruiting and placement.  Since the mid-90s, interns have been utilized primarily for recruiting, while more full-time professionals fill administrative roles.

In or near each park where students were placed, local men and women were organized and equipped to provide ongoing support, encouragement, and guidance to students through the summer. These local "Ministry Support Committees" are still an essential part of each park's ministry programs.

Leadership
ACMNP has had five different executive directors. Rev. Warren Ost directed the ministry from its founding until he retired in 1996. Ost helped expand ACMNP into more than 25 national parks, national monuments, recreation areas, and national forests before his death in 1997. Ost is survived by his wife, Nancy Ost, who has been an active participant in the ministry since its inception.

Rev. Richard P. Camp, Jr. became the ministry's second director in 1996, after a 22-year career as chaplain at the United States Military Academy at West Point. During Rev. Camp's season as the director, the ministry's national office was moved from New York, to Boston, and then to Freeport, Maine. Rev. Camp retired from his role as the executive director in the fall of 2008.

In 2008, Rev Spencer L. Lundgaard became ACMNP's third executive director. One of Rev. Lundgaard's first initiatives was to relocate the ACMNP national office to Denver, Colorado.

In January 2018, Amy Kennedy and David Degler were named interim co-executive directors. They had been working in the National Office as the director of placement and communications and the director of program and leadership respectively. Later that year, at the September Fall Celebration in Glacier National Park, they were named ACMNP's first-ever co-executive directors.

References

Christian organizations established in 1952
Evangelicalism in the United States
Evangelical parachurch organizations
Christian youth organizations
Christian organizations established in the 20th century
Student religious organizations in the United States
1952 establishments in the United States